Sir James Chatterton, 1st Baronet (died 9 April 1806), was an Irish lawyer and politician, and the first of the Chatterton Baronets of Castle Mahon.

Life
He was the eldest son of Abraham Chatterton (died 1776), of Cork City, and his wife Martha Roche, daughter of Edmund Roche of Trabolgan. The Chatterton family had settled in Ireland during the reign of Elizabeth I. Thomas Chatterton, the founder of the Irish branch of the family, was granted an estate at Ardee in County Louth in 1573. The family later acquired lands in County Cork.

Chatterton entered the Middle Temple in 1770 and was called to the Bar in 1774. He sat in the Irish House of Commons, first for Baltimore in 1781, and then for Doneraile from 1783 to 1797. He was created a baronet in 1801, presumably as a reward for supporting the Act of Union 1800. He was appointed Third Irish Serjeant in 1791 and Second Serjeant in 1793; he held the latter office until his death. He was also Keeper of the State Papers in Ireland: this office was apparently a sinecure.

Family
In 1790 Chatterton married Rebecca Lane (died 17 February 1838), daughter of Abraham Lane of Cork, by whom he had five children. Their first son, Sir William Abraham Chatterton (5 August 1794 – 1855), married on 3 August 1824, Henrietta-Georgiana, only child of the Reverend Lascelles Iremongor, Prebendary of Winchester. He died without issue in 1855. His widow subsequently married Edward Heneage Dering of the Coldstream Guards on 1 June 1859.

On William's death, his brother James succeeded to the baronetcy.

The three daughters of the marriage were:
Anne, who married the Reverend Richard Dickson, of Vermont, County Limerick, and died in 1835
Martha, who married A. E. Orpen, M. D. and died on 24 January 1857
Their only daughter, Rebecca-Dulcibella, was married on 18 July 1867 to Marmion-Edward Ferrers of Baddesley Clinton, Warwickshire.
Rebecca, who in 1826 married Charles Wedderburn Webster of the 12th Royal Lancers and died on 22 June 1858

Arms

References

Debrett, John, Baronetage of England, London 1840
Hart, A. R. History of the King's Serjeants at law in Ireland, Dublin, Four Courts Press, 2000
Montgomery-Massingberd, Hugh, Burke's Irish Family Records, London, 1976

1806 deaths
People from Cork (city)
Members of the Parliament of Ireland (pre-1801) for County Cork constituencies
Irish MPs 1776–1783
Irish MPs 1783–1790
Irish MPs 1790–1797
Year of birth uncertain
Members of the Middle Temple
Baronets in the Baronetage of the United Kingdom
Serjeants-at-law (Ireland)